North West Delhi is an administrative district of the National Capital Territory of Delhi in India.

Geography
North West Delhi is bounded by the Yamuna River on the northeast, and by the districts of North Delhi to the east and southeast, West Delhi to the south, Jhajjar District of Haryana state to the west, Sonipat District of Haryana to the northwest and north, Bagpat District and Ghaziabad District of Uttar Pradesh state to the northeast across the Yamuna.

Demographics

According to the 2011 census North West Delhi has a population of 3,656,539, roughly equal to the nation of Liberia or the US state of Oklahoma. This gives it a ranking of 78th in India (out of a total of 640). Its population growth rate over the decade 2001–2011 was 27.63%. North West Delhi has a sex ratio of 862 females for every 1000 males, and a literacy rate of 84.66%.

The bifurcated district had a population of 2,250,816, of which 2,205,605 (97.99%) of the population lived in urban areas. The district had a sex ratio of 872 females per 1000 males. Scheduled Castes made up 19.31% of the population.

At the time of the 2011 census, 86.10% of the population spoke Hindi, 4.04% Punjabi, 1.95% Urdu, 1.72% Bhojpuri 1.13% Haryanvi and 1.08% Maithili as their first language.

Administration
Administratively, the district is divided into three subdivisions: Saraswati Vihar, Rohini Sub City, and Kanjhawala.

References

External links
 North West Delhi District, Official website
 Detailed Map of North West Delhi District

North West Delhi district
Districts of Delhi